Lost in the Feeling is the ninth studio album by American country music artist Mark Chesnutt. This album marked Chesnutt's return to MCA after the dissolution of the Decca Records Nashville division in 1999. The two singles from this album, which were the title track and "Fallin' Never Felt So Good", both failed to reach Top 40 on the Hot Country Songs charts, making this the first studio album of Chesnutt's career not to have any Top 40 hits.

Both "Fallin' Never Felt So Good" and "Confessin' My Love" were recorded and released as singles from Shawn Camp's self-titled debut album in 1993. The former was originally recorded by Dude Mowrey on his 1991 debut album Honky Tonk as well. "Try Being Me" was previously recorded by Larry Stewart on 1994's Heart Like a Hurricane, and "It Pays Big Money" was later recorded under the title "Big Money" by Garth Brooks on his 2001 album Scarecrow. The title track is a Conway Twitty cover, and a cover of Gene Watson's "Love in the Hot Afternoon" is included as well.

Track listing
"Fallin' Never Felt So Good" (Shawn Camp, Will Smith) - 3:52
"Confessin' My Love" (Camp, John Scott Sherrill) - 3:24
"Halfway Back to Birmingham" (Don Cook, Mark Wright, Ronnie Rogers) - 3:26
"Try Being Me" (Tim Mensy) - 3:50
"Go Away" (Mark Nesler, Tony Martin) - 3:18
"It Pays Big Money" (Camp, Randy Hardison, Wynn Varble) - 4:06
"Love in the Hot Afternoon" (Vince Matthews, Keny Westberry) - 3:43
"Angelina" (Steve Diamond, Rick Orozco, Vern Dant) - 2:58
"Lost in the Feeling" (Lewis Anderson) - 3:04
"Somewhere out There Tonight" (Rogers) - 3:28

Personnel

 Mark Casstevens – acoustic guitar
 Mark Chesnutt – lead vocals
 Lisa Cochran – background vocals
 Eric Darken – percussion
 Stuart Duncan – fiddle, mandolin
 Larry Franklin – fiddle, mandolin
 Paul Franklin – pedal steel guitar
 Owen Hale – drums
 Mike Haynes – trumpet
 Jim Horn – saxophone
 Carl Jackson – background vocals
 John Barlow Jarvis – piano
 Marabeth Jordon – background vocals
 Sam Levine – saxophone
 Brice Long – background vocals
 B. James Lowry – acoustic guitar, electric guitar
 Tim Mensy – acoustic guitar
 Steve Nathan – keyboards
 Michael Rhodes – bass guitar
 Brent Rowan – electric guitar
 John Wesley Ryles – background vocals
 Lisa Silver – background vocals
 Dennis Solee – saxophone
 Harry Stinson – background vocals
 George Tidwell – trumpet
 Wynn Varble – background vocals
 Cindy Walker – background vocals
 Biff Watson – acoustic guitar
 Bergen White – string arrangements, conductor, background vocals
 John Willis – bouzouki, acoustic guitar
 Lonnie Wilson – drums, tambourine
 Lee Ann Womack – background vocals
 Glenn Worf – bass guitar
 Curtis Young – background vocals

Chart performance

References

2000 albums
Mark Chesnutt albums
MCA Records albums
Albums produced by Mark Wright (record producer)